Batya Friedman is an American professor in the University of Washington Information School. She is also an adjunct professor in the Paul G. Allen School Computer Science and Engineering and adjunct professor in the Department of Human-Centered Design and Engineering, where she directs the Value Sensitive Design Research Lab. She received her PhD in learning sciences from the University of California, Los Angeles School of Education in 1988, and has an undergraduate degree in computer science and mathematics.

Work 
Friedman is known for pioneering value sensitive design (VSD), an approach to account for human values in the design of information systems.

Currently, Friedman is the Co-Director of Value Sensitive Design Lab, and was the former Co-Director of the UW Technology Policy Lab.

Awards 
 2021 ACM Fellow
 "Gilles Hondius Fellow" - Technical University of Delft, 2020
 Honorary Doctorate - Technical University of Delft, 2020
 ACM SIGCHI Academy - ACM SIGCHI, 2019
 Induction into Membership - ACM SIGCHI Academy, 2019
 Social Impact Award - ACM SIGCHI, 2012
 Multi-disciplinary Privacy Paper Award, 2010
 Multi-disciplinary Privacy Paper Award, Honorable Mention, 2010
 Best Paper Award, Organizational Systems Track - HCISS, 2002
 TAP: ACM list of notable female computer scientists, 1997

Selected publications 

 Friedman, B., & Hendry, D. G. (2019). Value sensitive design: shaping technology with moral imagination. Cambridge, MA. MIT Press. 
 Friedman, B. (2008). Value Sensitive Design. In D. Schuler, Liberating Voices: A Pattern Language for Communication Revolution (pp. 366–368). The MIT Press 
 Friedman, B., & Hendry, D. (2012). The envisioning cards: a toolkit for catalyzing humanistic and technical imaginations. Proceedings of the SIGCHI Conference on Human Factors in Computing Systems, 1145–1148. https://doi.org/10.1145/2207676.2208562.
 Friedman, B. (2004). Value Sensitive Design. In W. S. Bainbridge (Ed.), Encyclopedia of Human-computer Interaction (pp. 769–774). Berkshire Publishing Group. 
 Friedman, B., & Kahn, P. H. (2003). Human values, ethics, and design. In A. Sears, J. A. Jacko, & S. Garfinkel, The Human-Computer Interaction Handbook: Fundamentals, Evolving Technologies and Emerging Applications (2nd ed., pp. 1241–1266). CRC Press.
 Friedman, B., & Kahn, P. H. (2000). New directions: a value-sensitive design approach to augmented reality. Proceedings of DARE 2000 on Designing Augmented Reality Environments, 163–164. https://doi.org/10.1145/354666.354694
 Friedman, B. (1996, December 1). Value-sensitive design. ACM interactions, 3(6), 16–23. https://doi.org/10.1145/242485.242493
 Friedman, B., & Kahn, P. H. (1992). Human agency and responsible computing: Implications for computer system design. Journal of Systems and Software, 17(1), 7–14. https://doi.org/10.1016/0164-1212(92)90075-U

References

External links 

University of Washington faculty
American women scientists
Year of birth missing (living people)
Living people
American women academics
21st-century American women
Fellows of the Association for Computing Machinery